This is a list of notable events in Latin music (i.e. Spanish- and Portuguese-speaking music from Latin America, Europe, and the United States) that took place in 1995.

Events 
 January 7: Fonovisa, Global Records, and Sony Discos settle out of court after an infringement with Marco Antonio Solís and Los Bukis in December 1994.
 January 20: The Los Angeles Police Department raided a piracy business in a San Fernando Valley area and confiscated 55,000 Latin music cassettes worth an estimated $500,000 (1995 USD).
 January 21: The Latin music categories for the 37th Annual Grammy Awards are revealed. In addition, the National Academy of Recording Arts and Sciences introduces a new category for Latin jazz albums.
 January 28:
 The Mexican peso crisis sets off an uncertainty for Latin music, as regional Mexican music remained one of the biggest music genres and could have negatively affect Latin music as a whole. Due to the crisis, EMI Music Mexico began reducing stuff, becoming the first Latin music company to do so.
 KAFY-AM (based in Bakersfield, California) and KELF-AM (based in Santa Barbara, California) were dropped from the Hot Latin Tracks reporting radio panels due to format changes.
 February 4:
 American executive and musician Jay Ziskrout forms Grita Records a label aimed at the Latin Alternative, or rock en español, market in the United States.
 A report published by Billboard magazine showed that unsigned Latin music acts in Canada were easily selling thousands of copies, showing a correlation in Canada's melting pot cities Toronto, Montreal, and Vancouver.
 February 11: Little Joe and La Mafia decided not to attend the 1995 Tejano Music Awards and spoke out against the organization for what they believed to be a faulty voting process. 
 February 18:
 The rise of samba paulista sees a spike of interest among major record companies such as music club Bertelsmann Music Group, Polygram Records, EMI Brazil, Continental Records, and Sony Music Brazil.
 Early estimates by Sony Music believed that the Brazilian music market would increase 10% in 1995 from 1994 sales figures provided by the Associação Brasileira dos Produtores de Discos (ABPD).
 February 23: At the 37th annual Music Business Association (NARM), Warner Music Group director of Latin music sales, Gustavo Fernández is awarded for Luis Miguel's Segundo Romance (1994) for best-selling Latin album.
 February 25: The emergence of zumba music begins as music companies began marketing the genre.
March 1 – The 37th Annual Grammy Awards are held at the Shrine Auditorium in Los Angeles.
Luis Miguel wins the Grammy Award for Best Latin Pop Performance for his album Segundo Romance.
Cachao wins the Grammy Award for Best Tropical Latin Performance for his album Master Sessions, Vol. 1
Vikki Carr wins the Grammy Award for Best Mexican-American Performance for her album Recuerdo a Javier Solís
Arturo Sandoval wins the Grammy Award for Best Latin Jazz Album for his album Danzón (Dance On).
 March 4: The A-Z directory of the Hot Latin Songs chart debuts in Billboard magazine.
 March 17: The first annual Chilean Music Awards is held in the Chile de Santiago Stadium. Andean band Illapu won the most awards including Song of the Year, Best Group, and Best-selling Chilean Album of the Year.
 March 31:
 American Tejano performer Selena is shot and killed by Yolanda Saldívar, her friend and former manager of the singer's boutiques. The impact of the singer's death had a negative impact on Latin music, her genre—which she catapulted it into the mainstream market—suffered and its popularity waned following Selena's death. It was called an end of an era, as the Tejano market's "golden age" ended and never recovered.
 During the aftermath of Selena's death, the state of Texas cancelled all concerts that were scheduled for that day.
 American regional Mexican music television host Johnny Canales married his wife Nora.
 April 1: Beginning with the April 1, 1995 issue of Billboard magazine, the weekly column of Latin music called "Latin Notas" began incorporating a column dedicated to the Music of Chile spearheaded by Pablo Marquez of the El Mercurio. 
 April 4: American disk jockey Howard Stern mocked Selena's murder, burial, and mourners, and criticized her music. Stern said "Spanish people have the worst taste in music. They have no depth." He then played Selena's songs with gunshot noises in the background. After an arrest warrant for disorderly conduct was issued for him, Stern made an on-air statement, in Spanish. The League of United Latin American Citizens found Stern's apology unacceptable and urged a boycott of his show.
 April 8: Jose Antonio Eboli succeeds Jorge Undurraga as general manager of Sony Music Chile.
 April 8: Sergio Fasanelli founded Argentine indie label Disco Milagrosos aimed at the Latin metal market.
 April 15: Rodolfo Castro, Danny Barrocas, Gustavo Méndez, and Anthony Gonzalez founded Miami indie label Radio Vox, releasing its first maxi single by Fulano de Tal titled "Revolucion".
 April 29: Selena becomes the first Hispanic artist to have five charting titles on the Billboard 200 chart simultaneously.
 May 18: The 7th Lo Nuestro Awards:
 Selena posthumously wins four awards, becoming the biggest winner. A tribute is held in honor of Selena.
 June 5-7: The sixth annual Billboard Latin Music conference took place.
 The second annual Billboard Latin Music Awards is also held on June 7. Selena becomes the most awarded artist of the award ceremony, receiving four award posthumously including Hot Latin Tracks Artist of the Year. She is also posthumously inducted into the Billboard Latin Music Hall of Fame.
 July 18: Dreaming of You, the crossover album Selena was working on at the time of her death, was released. On the day of its availability, 175,000 copies were sold in the U.S.—a record for a female vocalist—and 331,000 copies sold in its first week. It debuted at number one on the Billboard 200 chart, becoming the first predominately Spanish-language album to do so.
 November 24–26: ShowMarket holds the first trade fair in Barcelona, Spain to focus on Latin music and relations among the Spanish- and Portuguese-speaking markets in Latin America, Europe, and the United States.

Bands formed 
Angel (electro-Latin)
Dos Almas (Latin jazz)
Llamame "Yanko" (Cuban salsa)
Grupo Raça (samba paulista)  
Os Morenos (samba paulista)
Ginga Pura (samba paulista)
Grupo Tempero (samba paulista)
Adryana Ribeiro (samba paulista)
Freddie Ravel of Earth, Wind & Fire begins his short venture in Latin music (Latin fusion)
Los Filis (zumba music) 
Caribbean Jazz Project (Latin jazz)
Pez (Latin psychedelic/progressive)
Verde (Latin metal/thrash)
No Demuestra (Argentine punk)
Bobby Pulido (Tejano)
Grupo Limite (Tejano)
Jennifer Pena (Tejano)
Enrique Iglesias (Latin pop)
Donato y Estefano (Latin pop)
Millie
Ilegales
Jailene Cintrón
Mayra Mayra

Bands reformed 
Djavan (on hiatus in 1991)
Myriam Hernandez (on hiatus in 1994)

Bands disbanded 
Selena y Los Dinos (formed in 1980)

Bands on hiatus 
Arizita (on hiatus until 1996)

Number-ones albums and singles by country 
List of number-one albums of 1995 (Spain)
List of number-one singles of 1995 (Spain)
List of number-one Billboard Top Latin Albums of 1995
List of number-one Billboard Hot Latin Tracks of 1995

Awards 
1995 Premio Lo Nuestro
1995 Billboard Latin Music Awards
1995 Tejano Music Awards

Albums released

First quarter

January

February

March

Second quarter

April

May

June

Third quarter

July

August

September

Fourth quarter

October

November

December

Unknown date

Best-selling records

Best-selling albums
The following is a list of the top 10 best-selling Latin albums in the United States in 1995, according to Billboard.

Best-performing songs
The following is a list of the top 10 best-performing Latin songs in the United States in 1995, according to Billboard.

Births 
January 7 – Leslie Grace, American bachata singer
January 12Nathy Peluso, Argentine singer
June 23Danna Paola, Mexican pop singer
September 25 – Sofía Reyes, Mexican pop singer

Deaths 
January 19 – Patricia Teherán, 26, Colombian vallenato singer (car accident)
March 29 – Carl Jefferson, 75, founder of Latin jazz label Concord Picante
March 31 – Selena, 23, American Tejano singer (murdered)
May 31 – Antonio Flores, 33, Spanish flamenco singer (suicide by drug overdose)
July 19 – Tomás Méndez, 68, Mexican ranchera composer
July 24 – Manuel Pareja Obregón, Spanish composer of Andalusian folk music
July 25 – Osvaldo Pugliese, Argentine tango musician

References

Sources
 
 
 
 

 
Latin music by year